The Workers Themselves': Revolutionary Syndicalism and International Labour, 1913–1923 is a 1989 history book written by Wayne Thorpe on the international development of syndicalism.

Bibliography 

 
 
 
 
 
 

1989 non-fiction books
English-language books
Labor history
Syndicalism